The Rufai Tekke or Sheikh Riza Tekke is a Cultural Monument of Albania, located in Berat and pertaining to the Rüfai Sufi order. The teqe (tekke in Turkish) was built in the 18th century by Ahmet Kurt Pasha and pertained to the Rüfai, a Sufi order.

References

Buildings and structures completed in the 18th century
Cultural Monuments of Albania
Buildings and structures in Berat
Ottoman architecture in Albania
Sufi tekkes in Albania
Rifa'i order